Agonopterix cyrniella is a moth of the family Depressariidae. It is found on Corsica.

References

Moths described in 1929
Agonopterix
Moths of Europe